is a Japanese voice actress affiliated with Aoni Production. She was born in Tokyo and is best known for her role of Kaoru Matsubara/Powered Buttercup in the Powerpuff Girls Z.

Filmography

Anime
Beyblade: Metal Fusion (Sora Akatsuki)
Clannad (Botan, Female student)
Clannad After Story (Botan, Child, Mother, Student)
D.C.S.S. ~Da Capo Second Season~ (Female Student)
Gegege no Kitarō (2007~2009) (Boy, Child)
Kekkaishi (Akira)
Monochrome Factor (High school female student)
Moribito: Guardian of the Spirit (Nobo)
Powerpuff Girls Z (Kaoru Matsubara/Powered Buttercup)
Speed Grapher
Yakitate!! Japan (Chihiro)

Original video animation (OVA)
Sakura Taisen: New York NY. (Kelly)

Video games
 Fist of the North Star: Ken's Rage (Myu and Taki)

References

External links 
Machiko Kawana at GamePlaza-Haruka Voice Acting Database 
Machiko Kawana at Hitoshi Doi's Seiyuu Database

1983 births
Living people
Voice actresses from Tokyo
Japanese voice actresses
Aoni Production voice actors